Dewa is an Indonesian soap opera television series which aired on RCTI from October 3, 2011 to February 10, 2012. The series was written by Serena Luna and directed by Desiana Larasati, stars Naysila Mirdad, Dude Harlino, Baim Wong and others.

Cast 
 Naysila Mirdad as Dewa
 Dude Harlino as Sakti
 Baim Wong as Ryan Andika Pratama
 Aura Kasih as Yola
 Alice Norin as Dita
 Arifin Putra as Yudha
 Fero Walandouw as Ariel
 Raya Kohandi as Anya
 Indra Bruggman as Indra
 Mey Chan as Nina
 Citra Kirana as Rana
 Cindy Fatika Sari as Gita
 Tengku Firmansyah as Ruslaan
 Cut Keke as  Wiwik
 Umar Lubis / Riza Shahab as Bonar
 Mona Ratuliu as Dini
 Ponco Buwono as Edi
 Moudy Wilhelmina as Maudy
 Minati Atmanegara as Rindu
 Al Fathir Muchtar as Fathir
 Wiwid Gunawan as Lasmi
 Ferry Irawan as Vino
 Lily SP as Nia
 Nicole Parham Adelaide as Nicole
 Krisna Mukti as Krisna
 August Melasz as Producer
 Ana Pinem as Madam Inem
 Jefan Nathanio as Dewa
 Anriza as Rahman
 Amanda Putri Julianti as Kania
 Masayu Anastasia as Ira

External links 
 Dewa Plot From SinemArt

2011 Indonesian television series debuts
2012 Indonesian television series endings
Indonesian television soap operas
RCTI original programming